Woollim Entertainment is a South Korean entertainment company founded in 2003 by Lee Jung-yeop.

The label is home to artists such as  Golden Child, Rocket Punch, Drippin, and Kwon Eun-bi. It has previously handled artists Epik High, Infinite, Lovelyz, Nell and actor Kim Min-seok.

History 

In June 2010, Woollim debuted their first ever boy group, Infinite.

In August 2013, Woollim Entertainment merged with SM Entertainment's subsidiary SM Culture & Contents (SM C&C) to form "Woollim Label", an independent record label whose music would be different from SM Entertainment's sounds with their own color of music and an eclectic lineup of artists.

In November 2014, Woollim debuted their first girl group, Lovelyz.

On March 21, 2016, SM C&C announced that it decided to separate its video content business from its music content business. SM C&C established Woollim Entertainment (Woollim Entertainment Co., Ltd) to handle its music content business, with SM C&C owning all stocks of the company. The partition came into effect on June 8, 2016.

In August 2017, Woollim debuted their second boy group after seven years, Golden Child.

In August 2019, Woollim debuted their second girl group, Rocket Punch.

In October 2020, Woollim debuted their third boy group, Drippin.

On November 1, 2021, Woollim Entertainment announced 7 out of 8 members of Lovelyz contract expired on November 16. Among the members, only Baby Soul, now using her real name Lee Su-jeong, has re-signed with the company, while the remaining members did not re-sign.

Artists

Recording artists

Soloists
 Lee Su-jeong
 Kwon Eun-bi

Groups
 Golden Child
 Rocket Punch
 Drippin

Special units
 Toheart

Former artists
 Epik High (2003–2008, 2009–2011)
 Kim Dong-ryul
 Lee Jin-young
 Kang Kyun-sung
 Kwak Jung-wook
 Tasty (2012–2015)
 Nell (2006–2016)
 Infinite (2010–2022)
 Hoya (2010–2017)
 L (2010–2019)
 Sungkyu (2010–2021)
 Dongwoo (2010–2021)
 Sungyeol (2010–2021)
 Sungjong (2010–2022)
 Woohyun (2010–2022)
 Kim Min-seok
Golden Child
Park Jae-seok (2017–2018)
 Oh Hyun-min
 Joo (2015–2020)
 Lovelyz (2014–2021)
 Jiae (2014–2021)
 Jisoo (2014–2021)
 Mijoo (2014–2021)
 Kei (2014–2021)
 Jin (2014–2021)
 Sujeong (2014–2021)
 Yein (2014–2021)
  Kim Chae-won (2018–2021)

References

External links
 

 
South Korean record labels
Talent agencies of South Korea
Record labels established in 2005
Music companies of South Korea
Labels distributed by CJ E&M Music and Live
Labels distributed by Kakao M